Jörg Kirsten (born 18 October 1967) is a German former footballer.

References

External links

1967 births
Living people
German footballers
East German footballers
FC Sachsen Leipzig players
FC Erzgebirge Aue players
SV Waldhof Mannheim players
FSV Zwickau players
Rot Weiss Ahlen players
2. Bundesliga players
Footballers from Leipzig
Association football forwards